The Strasbourg Kangaroos (Les Kangourous de Strasbourg in French) are a French Australian Football Club based in the north of France in Strasbourg. They are touted as being the biggest Aussie Rules club in France and have appeared in the French Championship twice.

History
The Kangaroos were the first all-French Australian football club, which was founded in 2005 by a sports teacher, Marc Jund, and a small group of friends.

Within the ASFA (Association Strasbougeoise de Football Australian), the team tried to popularise the sport which is still relevantly unknown in France. The club also has tried to create links with the Australian football championships of Germany, which serves at the same time a good example of the development and episodical structure for training of the game.

The club joined the German Championship in 2006  although having to change their name for the occasion, adopting that of the Black Devils of Strasbourg. In being that the name of 'Kangaroos' was already used by a team from Munich.

The Black Devils also integrate the club omnisport SUC (Strasbourg Université Club).

After having finished 5th of the German Championship, the club decided to leave AFLG in 2007 and reverted to the name of 'Kangaroos'.

In 2007 the club team took part in three friendly matches against German clubs. Nine player from the Kangaroos constituted the back bone of the French selection at the time of the European Championship in Hamburg. Where they finished 7th

In 2009 the French League was inaugurated. Strasbourg finished second in the French Championship behind Paris and fourth in the French Cup.

The Strasbourg Kangaroos are seeking new players for the 2010 season. Beginners and experienced players from Australia, France and elsewhere are welcome.

Team

2008
1  Marc JUND (French selector, ex-International)
2  Julien TANGUY (French International)
5  Nicolas VOILAND
6  Adam LE NEVEZ (c) (French International)
10 Nicolas COLOMB (French International)
14 Olivier LEMESLE (Ex-International, French Team Manager)
17 Adrien BONNEAU (French International)
18 Alexandre RIEBEL (Ex-International)

2007
 Grégory Choinka
 Jonathan Choinka
 Michaël Dargegen
 Yorick Decou
 Gwenhaël Deride
 Vincent Freeling
 Christophe Fressy
 Guillaume Jouanolle
 Marc Jund
 Frédéric Lancelin
 Olivier Lemesle
 Mickey Lemesle
 Adam Le Nevez
 Joevin L'Hotellier
 Guillermo Palau
 Alexandre Peuch
 Théo Renckert
 Alexandre Riebel
 Adrian Sambade

Australian rules football clubs in France
2005 establishments in France
Australian rules football clubs established in 2005